The 2009 Judo Grand Slam Tokyo was held in Tokyo, Japan, from 11 to 13 December 2009.

Medal summary

Men's events

Women's events

Source Results

Medal table

References

External links
 

2009 IJF World Tour
2009 Judo Grand Slam
Judo Grand Slam
Grand Slam, 2009
Judo Grand Slam Tokyo